The resolution of the Comintern of January 11, 1934, was an official political document, in which for the first time, an authoritative international organization has recognized the existence of a separate Macedonian nation and Macedonian language.

Background 
At that time there were few historians, ethnographers or linguists who claimed that a separate Macedonian nation and language existed. In early 20th century among the majority of the Slavs in the region of Macedonia coexisted Bulgarian ethnic sentiments and regional Macedonian identity. The partition of the Ottoman Macedonia between Balkan nation-states after the conclusion of the Balkan Wars (1912–1913) and World War I (1914–1918) left the area divided mainly between Greece and Serbia (later Yugoslavia). As result part of the Slav inhabitants of the region emigrated to Bulgarian Macedonia. Under Serbian control in Vardar Macedonia the locals faced with the policy of forced Serbianisation. The Greek governments also began promulgating a policy of persecution of the use of Slavic dialects both in public and in private, as well of expressions of any ethnic distinctiveness. In 1919 and 1927 population exchange agreements were signed and some of the Slavic-speaking population in Greece left for Bulgaria. In this way the Bulgarian community in most of the area began to reduce, either by population exchanges or by change of its ethnic identity.

Resolution 
In June 1931 the registrar of the Comintern Otto Kuusinen in his report on the national question to the Executive Committee, suggested that the main weakness of the Comintern was the insufficient appreciation of the national questions. Kuusinen called to discuss the national question in order to develop a new national program for each of the parties. Meanwhile, to the Balkan communist parties a directive was provided, for the gradual abandonment of the slogan of the Balkan Federation, highlighting in its foreground the "right of the distinct peoples of self-determination to a full separation". The reason for this political turning, was the rising of Nazism in Germany. Thus in 1932 a members of the Comintern sponsored IMRO (United), put for the first time the issue of the recognition of a separate Macedonian nation. This question was discussed among them, however, there was a split when Vasil Hadzhikimov and his group, refused to agree that the Macedonians are a separate people from the Bulgarians. Nevertheless, the highest institutions of the Comintern were informed about this issue from Dino Kyosev who gave a lecture in Moscow in 1933 on the distinct Macedonian national consciousness.

As a result in the autumn of 1933 the Macedonian Dimitar Vlahov - leader of the IMRO (United) and former Bulgarian diplomat, was summoned in Moscow and took part in a number of meetings. At one of them the Executive Committee ordered the leading cadres of the Balkan Secretariate, Valecki - a Pole, and Šmeral - a Czech, to draw up a special resolution on the issue. Because they had no concept of this problem, using Vlahov's help the resolution yet had been prepared. Vlahov claims, before the convening of the consultation the leadership had already its stand that the Macedonian nation exists. So on January 11, 1934, the Political Secretariat of the Executive Committee of the Comintern adopted its final decision on the Macedonian Question about the existence of a Macedonian nation. The basis of the new concept was the common view that the region of Macedonia is one of the pivots of future imperialist war and therefore the Comintern seeks an option to blunt the contradictions between the countries that possess it. This decision by the Comintern was the recognition of a separate Macedonian nation. According to Vlahov, that was precisely what happened in Moscow in 1934:

"I mentioned earlier that the Comintern itself wanted the Macedonian Question to be considered at one of the consultations of its executive committee. One day I was informed that the consultation would be held. And so it was. Before the convening of the consultation, the inner leadership of the committee had already reached its stand, including the question of Macedonian nation, and charged the Balkan Secretariat with the drafting of corresponding resolution... In the resolution, which we published in the Makedonsko Delo in 1934, it was concluded that the Macedonian nation exists".

He also mentioned that the resolution had a hostile reception both from members of the Bulgarian Communist Party and of the IMRO (United), residing in Moscow. At the meeting where the resolution was adopted, due to the negative reactions to it by the majority of Bulgarian communists present, fears were expressed that it would cause many left-wing Macedonian revolutionaries to switch to Ivan Mihailov's anti-communist VMRO. Vlahov himself was a member of both organizations and a Soviet spy, who declared himself until then as a Bulgarian. He accepted the decision without any personal reaction or substantive comment, that confirms he was operating in fact as a Communist agent. However, the Resolution didn't ever mention the ineffectual Vlahov as a leader of the  IMRO (United). The Resolution was published for the first time in the April issue of the IMRO (United) magazine "Makedonsko Delo". Following the decision of the Comintern, IMRO (United) took as its slogan "the right of the Macedonian people to self-determination up to secession" and formation of "Macedonian Republic of working masses". Despite the fact that this was formally a Resolution of IMRO (United), it was a document adopted by the Comintern, which was immediately published in all the mouthpieces of this international communist centre. Afterwards the mainstream Bulgarian public opinion has maintained that the Comintern is the "inventor" of the idea about the existence of a separate Macedonian nation.

Significance 
Prior to the Second World War, these views on the Macedonian issue had been of little practical importance. During the War the Macedonist ideas were further developed by the Yugoslav Communist Partisans, although  some researchers doubt that even at that time the Macedonian Slavs identified themselves to be a nationality separate from the Bulgarians. After the Red Army entered the Balkans in the late 1944, new communist regimes came into power in Bulgaria and Yugoslavia and their policy on the Macedonian Question was committed to the Resolution of supporting the development of a distinct ethnic Macedonian identity. A separate Macedonian language also was codified in 1945.

See also 
 Macedonian nationalism

Footnotes

External links
The Resolution of the Comintern on the Macedonian Nation and the Macedonian Language (1934)
The situation in Macedonia and the tasks of IMRO (United) "Makedonsko Delo", April 1934.

Comintern
History of North Macedonia
Society of North Macedonia
Macedonian nationalism
1934 in politics